Lars Kristian Bystøl (born 4 December 1978) is a Norwegian former ski jumper who competed from 2002 to 2008. His career highlights include an individual gold medal at the 2006 Winter Olympics, one individual World Cup victory, a gold medal in the Ski Flying World Championships, and two World Championship bronze medals in team competitions.

Career
Bystøl won his first and only World Cup event on 4 January 2006, by winning the third event of the 2005–06 Four Hills Tournament in Innsbruck. Eleven days later, Bystøl won a gold medal in the team event at the 2006 Ski Flying World Championships in Bad Mitterndorf.

He continued the World Cup season by placing between 10th and 20th in the next three individual events, before going to the 2006 Winter Olympics. He retained his top 15 position in the World Cup standings, which enabled him to qualify for the normal hill of the Olympics despite being disqualified in the qualifying run. Once there, he finished sixth in the first jump, but held on with a 103.5 metre second jump to win Olympic gold.

Bystøl finished 13th overall in the 2005/06 World Cup standings.

World Cup

Standings

Wins

Substance abuse
In 2000, he was sent home from a Continental Cup competition in Innsbruck after a party on New Year's Eve. Later that year he was caught DUI with a 2.38‰ blood alcohol content. He was sentenced to 24 days in prison. In 2003, after some heavy drinking, he fell into the ocean during a fight. Bystøl's alcoholism became so bad that it caused him to be kicked off the national ski jumping team in 2004, though he later managed to reclaim his spot on the team.

In early 2009, he admitted to having tested positive for tetrahydrocannabinol, a derivative of cannabis. The sample was delivered in November 2008 in a Norwegian Cup race in Vikersund.

Notes

References
 

1978 births
Doping cases in ski jumping
Living people
Norwegian prisoners and detainees
Prisoners and detainees of Norway
Norwegian sportspeople in doping cases
Olympic ski jumpers of Norway
Olympic gold medalists for Norway
Olympic bronze medalists for Norway
People from Voss
Ski jumpers at the 2002 Winter Olympics
Ski jumpers at the 2006 Winter Olympics
Olympic medalists in ski jumping
FIS Nordic World Ski Championships medalists in ski jumping
Medalists at the 2006 Winter Olympics
Sportspeople from Vestland